Tore Brunborg (born 20 May 1960) is a Norwegian jazz musician and composer who plays saxophone. He was born in Trondheim but grew up in Voss where a jazz environment was flowering. Known from numerous appearances with international greats including Bugge Wesseltoft, Håvard Wiik, Audun Kleive, Anders Jormin, Diederik Wissels, Arild Andersen, Pat Metheny, Per Jørgensen, Geir Lysne, Misha Alperin, Bjørn Alterhaug, Jan Gunnar Hoff, Jarle Vespestad, Jon Christensen, Jon Balke, Nils Petter Molvær, Vigleik Storaas, Bo Stief, and Billy Cobham.

Career
After playing with Knut Kristiansen and Per Jørgensen, Brunborg debuted at Vossajazz (1980, 1982). After this he studied music at Toneheim folkehøgskole and on the Jazz program at Trondheim Musikkonservatorium (1980–82), and has evolved to be one of the most sought jazz saxophonists in Norway.

He was on the lineup for the acclaimed band Masqualero and was three times awarded Spellemannprisen with this band. Brunborg also was within Jon Eberson's Jazzpunkensemblet (two record releases). He performed with Pat Metheny at the Moldejazz (2001), and has appeared in a wide range of lineups with different jazz orchestras since. At the Norwegian Jazz scene he has been most recognized for the cooperation with Arild Andersen and his music for "Kristin Lavransdatter", performed to the Olympic Games at Lillehammer. He is a member of the Jazz quartet Moment together with Jørn Øien, Jens Fossum and Andreas Bye.

During the past few years he has worked with Mathias Eick, Manu Katché, the Tord Gustavsen Ensemble and Ketil Bjørnstad. He also plays a key role on three of Mats Eilertsen's records (Radio Yonder, Sky Dive and Hymn for Hope), and with the band Scent of Soil fronted by vocalist Kirsti Huke and Brunborg. On their first album, they make use of material from a critically acclaimed commissioned work they wrote together for the Vossajazz Festival in 2010.

Awards and honors
 Spellemannprisen 1983 in the class jazz for the album Masqualero, with the band Masqualero
 Spellemannprisen 1986 in the class jazz for the album Bande a Part, with the band Masqualero
 Spellemannprisen 1991 in the class jazz for the album Re-enter, with the band Masqualero
 Vossajazzprisen 2013

Discography

Solo albums 
 1993: Tid (Curling Legs), with Bugge Wesseltoft and Jon Christensen
 1997: Prima Luna (Kirkelig Kulturverksted), with Kjetil Bjerkestrand
 1998: Orbit (Curling Legs), with Jarle Vespestad
 2003: Gravity (Vossa Jazz), with Bugge Wesseltoft, Lars Danielsson and Anders Engen
 2009: Lucid Grey (Dravle)
 2011: Scent of Soil (Hubro), with Kirsti Huke
 2012: Extended Circle (ECM)
 2015: Slow Snow (ACT)

Collaborations 
Within Masqualero, including Nils Petter Molvær, Arild Andersen, Jon Christensen
1983: Masqualero (Odin), Jon Balke
1983: Bande À Part (ECM), with Jon Balke
1988: Aero (ECM), with Frode Alnæs
1991: Re-enter (ECM)

With others
 1992: Night Caller [Label Bleu), with Rita Marcotulli, Michel Benita, Nils Petter Molvaer, Jon Christensen, Anders Kjellberg
 1995: Gull, Røkelse Og Myrra (Kirkelig Kulturverksted), with Kjetil Bjerkestrand
 1997: 'Mbara Boom (EmArcy), with Paolo Vinaccia, Arild Andersen, feat. Il Coro Di Neoneli
 2009: Restored, Returned (ECM) within Tord Gustavsen ensemble
 2010: Remembrance (ECM), with Ketil Bjørnstad
 2011: Skala (ECM), with Mathias Eick 
 2012: The Well (ECM) within Tord Gustavsen Quartet
 2014: Live in Concert (ACT), with Manu Katché
 2015: Everblue (L&H), with Yelena Eckemoff feat. Arild Andersen, Jon Christensen

References

External links 

20th-century Norwegian saxophonists
21st-century Norwegian saxophonists
Norwegian jazz saxophonists
Norwegian jazz composers
Norwegian University of Science and Technology alumni
Musicians from Trondheim
1960 births
Living people
20th-century saxophonists
1300 Oslo members
Trondheim Jazz Orchestra members
Geir Lysne Listening Ensemble members
Ab und Zu members
Jazzpunkensemblet members
Masqualero members
Tord Gustavsen Ensemble members